The Dirty Dozen is a Cato Institute book, written by Robert A. Levy and William Mellor and released in May 2008, about twelve U.S. Supreme Court decisions that were viewed as greatly undermining individual freedom by expanding the power of government.  The book was the subject of many reviews and much press. It was released around the time that Levy gained media attention as the organizer and financier behind District of Columbia v. Heller.

List of cases
The decisions criticized in the book are: 
 Wickard v. Filburn , which expanded federal power over intrastate production pursuant to the Commerce Clause;
 Helvering v. Davis , which held that Social Security was constitutionally permissible as an exercise of the federal power to spend for the general welfare and did not contravene the Tenth Amendment;
 Home Building & Loan Association v. Blaisdell , which held that Minnesota's suspension of creditors' remedies was not in violation of the United States Constitution;
 Whitman v.
 McConnell v. Federal Election Commission , which upheld the constitutionality of most of the Bipartisan Campaign Reform Act of 2002 (BCRA), often referred to as the McCain–Feingold Act;
 United States v. Miller , which allowed federal regulation of sawed-off shotguns;
 Korematsu v. United States , which upheld Japanese American internment;
 Bennis v. Michigan , which held that innocent owner defense is not constitutionally mandated by the Fourteenth Amendment's Due Process in cases of civil forfeiture.
 Kelo v. City of New London , which upheld the use of eminent domain to transfer land from one private owner to another to further economic development;
 Penn Central Transport Co. v. New York , which upheld the denial of compensation for regulatory takings;
 United States v. Caroline Products , which upheld federal regulation of goods traded in interstate commerce;
 Grutter v. Bollinger , which upheld the affirmative action admissions policy of the University of Michigan Law School.

References

Supreme Court of the United States
2008 non-fiction books